Miguel Ángel Sola Elizalde (born 29 September 1957) is a Spanish football manager and former player who played as a midfielder.

He amassed La Liga totals of 316 matches and 42 goals over 12 seasons, in representation of Athletic Bilbao and Osasuna.

In 1997, Sola started working as a coach.

Playing career
Born in Pamplona, Navarre, Sola joined Athletic Bilbao's youth system in 1975, spending his first seasons as a senior with Bilbao Athletic and on loan, the latter including a five-month spell with Basque neighbours Deportivo Alavés. In 1980, he returned as a full member of the main squad, going on to be an important unit during five years and totalling 57 La Liga games (nine goals) as the team won back-to-back national championships.

After leaving Athletic with official totals of 175 matches and 24 goals, Sola moved to his hometown with CA Osasuna, appearing and scoring regularly for them in six of his seven seasons. In 1990–91, already aged 33, he made 25 appearances as the club finished a best-ever fourth position, with the subsequent qualification to the UEFA Cup. He retired from the game at the end of the following campaign.

Coaching career
In 1997, with Osasuna in the Segunda División, Sola managed the team during eight matches, collecting five losses and only one win as they barely avoided relegation. In the following years, always in the lower leagues, he coached Peña Sport FC, Real Unión, SD Huesca and CD Mirandés.

On 24 March 2010, Sola returned to his native region and signed with CD Izarra, aiming to help the club avoid relegation from Segunda División B, which eventually did not happen. The next season, in the same tier, he was again in charge of Real Unión after replacing the fired Álvaro Cervera. 

Sola was appointed at CD Calahorra of the Tercera División in June 2017. He won promotion at the end of his first season as champions, but was dismissed on 17 February 2020 due to poor results.

Managerial statistics

Honours

Player
Athletic Bilbao
La Liga: 1982–83, 1983–84
Copa del Rey: 1983–84
Supercopa de España: 1984

Manager
Mirandés
Tercera División: 2006–07, 2007–08

References

External links

1957 births
Living people
Footballers from Pamplona
Spanish footballers
Association football midfielders
La Liga players
Segunda División players
Segunda División B players
Tercera División players
Bilbao Athletic footballers
Athletic Bilbao footballers
Deportivo Alavés players
CA Osasuna players
Spanish football managers
Segunda División managers
Segunda División B managers
Tercera División managers
CA Osasuna managers
Real Unión managers
SD Huesca managers
CD Mirandés managers